Be Good may refer to:

 Be Good (Alex Fong album)
 Be Good (Gregory Porter album)